Porush-e Bala (also Romanized as Porūsh-e Bālā; also known as Parūsh and Poroosh) is a village in Otaqvar Rural District, Otaqvar District, Langarud County, Gilan Province, Iran. At the 2006 census, its population was 117, in 29 families.

References 

Populated places in Langarud County